The Voice of Conscience is a 1912 American silent short drama film starring Florence La Badie and Jean Darnell.

Cast
 Florence La Badie as The Orphan
 Edmund J. Hayes as The Father
 Jean Darnell
 Justice Barnes as Doctor
 Harry Benham as Suitor

External links

1912 films
1912 drama films
1912 short films
Silent American drama films
American silent short films
American black-and-white films
Thanhouser Company films
1910s American films